The Other Shore is the third studio album of Egyptian trance music duo Aly & Fila. It was released on October 3, 2014 through Armada Music.

Track listing

Charts

References

External links
 Aly & Fila official website

2014 albums
Trance albums
Armada Music albums